Marco Antonio De Marchi (born 8 September 1966) is an Italian association football agent and former defender, who played as a centre-back.

Career
Born in Milan, De Marchi started his career with the Como youth system, and was successively sold to Serie C2 club Ospitaletto, where he made his professional debut. In 1987, he followed his head coach Luigi Maifredi at Serie B fallen giants Bologna, being protagonist of the team's promotion to the top flight and the successive campaign that led the rossoblu back into European football.

In 1990, he followed Maifredi once again, joining Juventus. After an unimpressive debut season, he was successively loaned out to AS Roma for the 1991–92 season. After a season back at Juventus where he played in the first leg of the victorious 1993 UEFA Cup Final, De Marchi successively agreed for a comeback to Bologna in May 1993, becoming also the team captain and playing there for four more seasons, his last ones as a footballer in Italy. In 1997, he agreed for a move abroad to Eredivisie side Vitesse Arnhem, and in 2000 he went to Dundee with little success before retiring from active football in 2002.

Honours
Ospitaletto
Serie C2: 1986-87

Bologna
Serie B: 1987–88, 1995–96
Serie C1: 1994–95

Juventus
UEFA Cup: 1992–93

References

External links
Profile at lega-calcio.it 

1966 births
Living people
Footballers from Milan
Italian footballers
Association football defenders
Bologna F.C. 1909 players
Juventus F.C. players
A.S. Roma players
SBV Vitesse players
Dundee F.C. players
Serie A players
Serie B players
Serie C players
Eredivisie players
Scottish Premier League players
Expatriate footballers in the Netherlands
Expatriate footballers in Scotland
Italian expatriate sportspeople in the Netherlands
Italian expatriate sportspeople in Scotland
Italian expatriate footballers
UEFA Cup winning players